The Madeira Regional Election (2000) was an election held on 15 October 2000 for the legislative assembly and government of the Portuguese autonomous region of the Madeira. There were 61 seats in dispute, two more than in the previous election, distributed by the 11 municipalities of the archipelago proportionally to the number of registered voters of each municipality.

The winner of the election in Madeira was, once more, the Social Democratic Party, and Alberto João Jardim was elected president of the Regional Government with an absolute majority for the 7th consecutive time. The percentage gathered by the Social Democrats decreased by 1%, however, due to the increase of the overall number of MPs, the party kept their 41 mandates.

The People's Party increased its voting and its number of MPs, gathering a total of 3 mandates.

On the left, the Socialist Party kept its 13 MPs after, despite losing more than 3% of the voting. The Unitary Democratic Coalition, led by the Portuguese Communist Party, increased the voting and kept the 2 Mps of the previous election. The People's Democratic Union raised the number of MPs from 1 to 2 after a slight increase of the voting.

Voter turnout was lower, compared with 1996, with 61.9% of the electorate casting their ballot on election day.

Electoral system
In this election, the members of the regional parliament were elected in 11 constituencies, representing the 11 municipalities of Madeira, that were awarded a determined number of member to elect according with the number of registered voters in those constituencies. The method use to elect the members was the D'Hondt method. In this election the number of MPs to be elected rose from 59 in 1996 to 61.

Political parties
A total of 6 political parties presented lists of candidates for the regional elections in Madeira, where 209,541 electors could elect 61 deputies to the Legislative Assembly. The list of parties running was the following:

 Democratic Unity Coalition (CDU), an alliance of the Greens and Portuguese Communist Party (PCP).
 People's Democratic Union (UDP).
 People's Party (CDS-PP)
 National Solidarity Party (PSN)
 Socialist Party (PS), leader José Carlos Pinto Basto da Mota Torres.
 Social Democratic Party (PSD), leader Alberto João Jardim.

Results

Summary of votes and seats

|-
! rowspan="2" colspan=2 style="background-color:#E9E9E9" align=left|Parties
! rowspan="2" style="background-color:#E9E9E9" align=right|Votes
! rowspan="2" style="background-color:#E9E9E9" align=right|%
! rowspan="2" style="background-color:#E9E9E9" align=right|±pp swing
! colspan="5" style="background-color:#E9E9E9" align="center"|MPs
! rowspan="2" colspan=5 style="background-color:#E9E9E9" align=right|MPs %/votes %
|- style="background-color:#E9E9E9"
! align="center"|1996
! align="center"|2000
! style="background-color:#E9E9E9" align=right|±
! style="background-color:#E9E9E9" align=right|%
! style="background-color:#E9E9E9" align=right|±
|-
| 
|72,588||55.95||0.9||41||41||0||67.21||2.3||1.20
|-
| 
|27,290||21.04||3.8||13||13||0||21.31||0.7||1.01
|-
| 
|12,612||9.72||2.4||2||3||1||4.92||1.5||0.51
|-
|style="width: 10px" bgcolor=#E2062C align="center" | 
|align=left|People's Democratic Union
|6,210||4.79||0.8||1||2||1||3.28||1.6||0.68
|-
| 
|6,015||4.64||0.6||2||2||0||3.28||0.1||0.71
|-
|style="width: 10px" bgcolor=#000080 align="center" | 
|align=left|National Solidarity
|2,243||1.73||1.1||0||0||0||0.00||0.0||0.0
|-
|colspan=2 align=left style="background-color:#E9E9E9"|Total valid
|width="50" align="right" style="background-color:#E9E9E9"|126,958
|width="40" align="right" style="background-color:#E9E9E9"|97.86
|width="40" align="right" style="background-color:#E9E9E9"|0.3
|width="40" align="right" style="background-color:#E9E9E9"|59
|width="40" align="right" style="background-color:#E9E9E9"|61
|width="40" align="right" style="background-color:#E9E9E9"|2
|width="40" align="right" style="background-color:#E9E9E9"|100.00
|width="40" align="right" style="background-color:#E9E9E9"|0.0
|width="40" align="right" style="background-color:#E9E9E9"|—
|-
|colspan=2|Blank ballots
|1,136||0.88||0.2||colspan=6 rowspan=4|
|-
|colspan=2|Invalid ballots
|1,640||1.26||0.2
|-
|colspan=2 align=left style="background-color:#E9E9E9"|Total
|width="50" align="right" style="background-color:#E9E9E9"|129,734
|width="40" align="right" style="background-color:#E9E9E9"|100.00
|width="40" align="right" style="background-color:#E9E9E9"|
|-
|colspan=2|Registered voters/turnout
||209,541||61.91||3.4
|-
| colspan=11 align=left | Source: Comissão Nacional de Eleições
|}

Distribution by constituency

|- class="unsortable"
!rowspan=2|Constituency!!%!!S!!%!!S!!%!!S!!%!!S!!%!!S
!rowspan=2|TotalS
|- class="unsortable" style="text-align:center;"
!colspan=2 | PSD
!colspan=2 | PS
!colspan=2 | CDS-PP
!colspan=2 | UDP
!colspan=2 | CDU
|-
| style="text-align:left;" | Calheta
| style="background:; color:white;"|66.3
| 3
| 7.4
| -
| 21.8
| -
| 1.3
| -
| 0.9
| -
| 3
|-
| style="text-align:left;" | Câmara de Lobos
| style="background:; color:white;"|67.8
| 5
| 15.1
| 1
| 6.7
| -
| 3.3
| -
| 4.4
| -
| 6
|-
| style="text-align:left;" | Funchal
| style="background:; color:white;"|50.2
| 15
| 19.3
| 6
| 10.7
| 3
| 7.3
| 2
| 7.5
| 2
| 28
|-
| style="text-align:left;" | Machico
| style="background:; color:white;"|56.1
| 3
| 31.3
| 2
| 5.3
| -
| 2.6
| -
| 2.3
| -
| 5
|-
| style="text-align:left;" | Ponta do Sol
| style="background:; color:white;"|59.0
| 2
| 28.0
| -
| 8.5
| -
| 2.0
| -
| 0.5
| -
| 2
|-
| style="text-align:left;" | Porto Moniz
| style="background:; color:white;"|57.8
| 1
| 33.6
| 1
| 5.4
| -
| 0.6
| -
| 0.7
| -
| 2
|-
| style="text-align:left;" | Porto Santo
| style="background:; color:white;"|50.2
| 1
| 43.1
| 1
| 2.6
| -
| 1.4
| -
| 0.3
| -
| 2
|-
| style="text-align:left;" | Ribeira Brava
| style="background:; color:white;"|69.2
| 3
| 13.7
| -
| 10.1
| -
| 0.8
| -
| 1.2
| -
| 3
|-
| style="text-align:left;" | Santa Cruz
| style="background:; color:white;"|52.5
| 4
| 26.4
| 2
| 9.8
| -
| 4.1
| -
| 3.4
| -
| 6
|-
| style="text-align:left;" | Santana
| style="background:; color:white;"|63.6
| 2
| 22.7
| -
| 7.4
| -
| 2.0
| -
| 0.9
| -
| 2
|-
| style="text-align:left;" | São Vicente
| style="background:; color:white;"|60.9
| 2
| 23.5
| -
| 9.5
| -
| 2.0
| -
| 0.9
| -
| 2
|- class="unsortable" style="background:#E9E9E9"
| style="text-align:left;" | Total
| style="background:; color:white;"|56.0
| 41
| 21.0
| 13
| 9.7
| 3
| 4.8
| 2
| 4.6
| 2
| 61
|-
| colspan=12 style="text-align:left;" | Source: Comissão Nacional de Eleições
|}

References

External links
Comissão Nacional de Eleições
Legislative Assembly of Madeira - Official website

See also
2000 Azores regional election

Madeira 2000
Madeira